The Kisco River is a creek that runs through the Mount Kisco, New York area. It is formed by the forks of Chappaqua Brook and an unnamed stream. It follows a  winding course before emptying into the New Croton Reservoir at Lake Road Bridge in the town of New Castle near the hamlet of Stanwood and eventually into the Atlantic Ocean via the Croton River, the Hudson River, and New York Harbor.

Its name is derived from the village of Mount Kisco, which the river flows through. The name of Mount Kisco is further derived from "seesquee", which may also be written as "cisqua", which is the Algonquin word for "muddy place", referring to the marshlands in the area.

Course description

The Kisco River begins at the highlands of Arthur W. Butler Memorial Sanctuary, and travels westward in New Castle until it feeds into Wallace Pond at Leonard Park in Mount Kisco. It then runs along the "Early Settler's Trail", and passes the former location of the Spencer Optical Factory which is now a nature trail. After this it runs underneath Route 133. It then runs through "Riverwoods", a town house complex. It continues past the Bedford Yeshiva Farm Settlement, a small yeshiva. The Riverwoods wastewater treatment plant discharges its wastewater into the river at this point. It then passes underneath Croton Lake Road and empties into the Muscoot Reservoir 

Several storm drains empty into the river along its course. It runs through a primarily developed wetland area.

See also
List of rivers of New York

Croton Watershed
Rivers of Westchester County, New York
Tributaries of the Hudson River
Rivers of New York (state)
Mount Kisco, New York